Risco is a Spanish municipality in the province of Badajoz, Extremadura. According to the 2014 census, the municipality has a population of 151 inhabitants.

References

External links

Profile 

 auto

Municipalities in the Province of Badajoz